is a Japanese actor, singer and talent who is a member of Japanese idol group Naniwa Danshi under Johnny & Associates.

Career
Michieda Shunsuke was born in Osaka, Japan. His mother is a big fan of SMAP, so he grew up listening to songs from SMAP and Hey! Say! JUMP from a very young age; he also became a fan of Johnny's. He was a fan of the 2014 drama The Files of Young Kindaichi drama starring Ryosuke Yamada of Hey! Say! JUMP, and sent his resume to Johnny & Associates. After he sent his resume for the fourth time, he was contacted and participated in an audition broadcast on Kansai Telecasting Corporation in Maido! Johnny on 2 May 2015. His audition was also broadcast on BS Fuji on 11 January 2015 and on the 18 January and 5 May broadcasts of the studio Show Time. He joined Johnny & Associates on 23 November 2014 after being chosen out of hundreds who auditioned. His first appearance at a concert was the Haruyasumi Kansai Johnny's Jr. Special show held in Osaka Shochikuza in March 2015.  He has been a back-up dancer for Sexy Zone and A.B.C-Z.

Michieda's first drama appearance was on the Nippon TV wednesday Drama series Haha ni naru broadcasting in the period of April 2017. Also, in August of the same year, his role in Kansai Johnny's Jr. no Owarai Star Tanjō! became his first movie appearance. He has made several prime-time TV appearances ever since. His guest appearance on "絶対零度 (Zettaireido)" in August 2018 won him acclaims from both critics and audience.

In May 2018, he worked with Kento Nagao, now a fellow member of Naniwa Danshi, on Chibikko Owarai Shichihenka Shōnen KABUKI (ちびっ子お笑い七変化 少年KABUKI). In October of that same year, he was chosen as a member of the Kansai branch Johnny's Jr. pre-debut group "Naniwa Danshi" (なにわ男子: Men from Naniwa, Osaka).

In November 2019, he won first place in the NEXT category of the voting project "National Treasure Class Handsome Ranking in the Second Half of 2019" of ViVi.

On 29 March 2021, he starred in the stage "Romeo and Juliet", playing the role of Romeo. On 12 November, he made his debut as Naniwa Danshi with the single "Ubu Love".

In April 2022, Michieda appeared in the role of Hajime Kindaichi, the protagonist of The Files of Young Kindaichi. Regarding his decision to play the role, he said, "It's the work that inspired me to join Johnny's, and it's the work I've continuously said I wanted to do since I joined my agency, so I'm very happy that I've fulfilled my goal of seven years". On 14 July, he won first place in the NOW category of the voting project "National Treasure Class Handsome Ranking for the First Half of 2022" of ViVi. On 29 July, he played the lead role of Tōru Kamiya in Even If This Love Disappears from the World Tonight, marking his first starring role in a movie.

The Origin of His Name Kanji 
His name was chosen by his father and contains the character "駿 (pronounce it 'shun')" because he was born in the year of the horse(Japanese year tradition horse year. For more information about the tradition, see Earthly Branches), and "佑 (pronounce it 'suke')" because he thought the kanji was cool.

His Special Skills 
His special skill is Aikido, which he did from his first to sixth year of elementary school until he joined Johnny's.

Filmography

TV dramas

Films

Concerts

Stage

Awards

References

External links
net > Johnny's Jr. – Johnny's Jr. official website by Johnny & Associates 

Japanese television personalities
Male actors from Osaka Prefecture
2002 births
Living people